Sneschana Russewa-Hoyer (born January 10, 1953) is a Bulgarian engraver and medallist. She lives in Berlin, Germany.

Life   
She was born Sneschana Russewa in  Krushari, Bulgaria. She received her  secondary education at an arts school in  Sofia. She studied from 1972 to 1977 at the Kunsthochschule Berlin-Weißensee (Weißensee Academy of Art Berlin).
In 1976 she married the sculptor , who had finished his studies at the same academy in 1975.

Work  
Sneschana Russewa-Hoyer worked together with her husband Heinz Hoyer in the design of many DDR stamps and coins. After the German Unification in 1990 the Hoyers were creating coins and medals for the Federal Republic of Germany with great success.

An example for a coin design is the national side of the German 1 Euro and 2 Euro coins. These coins are the most common coins in use for more than 300 Million inhabitants of the Eurozone.

Collections
British Museum
Münzkabinett, Berlin
Friedrich-Schiller-Universität Jena

Notes 

1953 births
People from Dobrich Province
Bulgarian numismatists
Medallists
Bulgarian engravers
German medallists
Living people